The Stewartville Formation is a geologic formation in Iowa. It preserves fossils dating back to the Ordovician period.

See also

 List of fossiliferous stratigraphic units in Iowa
 Paleontology in Iowa

References
 

Ordovician Minnesota
Ordovician Iowa
Ordovician southern paleotropical deposits